J. Edgar Sexton (born October 28, 1936) is a former judge of the Canadian Federal Court of Appeal.

References

1936 births
Living people
Judges of the Federal Court of Appeal (Canada)
Place of birth missing (living people)